St. Hilarius may refer to:

Saints
 Hilarius or Hilary of Poitiers (c. 310–c. 367), Bishop of Poitiers and Doctor of the Church
 Pope Hilarius (died 468), Catholic pope and saint
 Hilarius or Hilary of Arles (c. 403–449), Bishop of Arles and saint

Other uses
 St. Hilarius Parish Church of Näfels, Näfels, Glarus Canton, Switzerland